The Jock series is a superseries of sports anthem music albums started by Tommy Boy Records and ESPN in 1994.

The Jock series consists of the Jock Rock, the Jock Jams and the Slam Jams series.

Jock Rock
The Jock Rock series of albums consisted of alternative and classic rock songs. Some tracks on the Jock Rock albums were dubbed into the "Jock Jam Megamix".

Jock Jams
Albums in the Jock Jams series mainly consist of 1980s and 1990s dance and house music, as well as hip hop, classic disco, mashups, and cheerleaders and other sports figures saying phrases. When some of the songs and quotes became popular, they were incorporated into a mash-up entitled "The Jock Jam".

 
Sports compilation albums